CKOB-FM is a French-language Canadian radio station located in Trois-Rivières, Quebec.

Owned and operated by Cogeco, it broadcasts on 106.9 MHz using a directional antenna with an average effective radiated power of 59,000 watts and a peak effective radiated power of 100,000 watts, as a Class C1 station. The station moved to the FM band on August 20, 2007 ; it was previously heard on the AM band, on 550 kHz, with a daytime power of 10,000 watts and a nighttime power of 5,000 watts as a class B station, using a directional antenna with slightly different daytime and nighttime directional patterns in order to protect various other stations on that frequency.

The station identifies itself as 106,9 FM and is one of the few full-time FM talk stations in North America to broadcast in stereo.

CKOB went on the air as CHLN, an AM station on October 17, 1937, and was originally on 1420 kHz; it moved to 1450 in 1941, and moved again to 550 in 1945.

CHLN had one rebroadcaster, namely CKSM in Shawinigan. That station broadcast on 1220 kHz, with a daytime power of 10,000 watts and a nighttime power of 2,500 watts as a class B station, using a directional antenna with slightly different daytime and nighttime directional patterns in order to protect various other stations on that frequency. CKSM went on the air on April 29, 1951, and ceased to produce local programming on June 12, 1995. CKSM was not owned by Corus Entertainment as it was retained by Astral Media; it ceased to broadcast on June 30, 2007.

CHLN was authorized by the Canadian Radio-television and Telecommunications Commission (CRTC) to move to FM on November 24, 2006. CHLN started broadcasting at 106.9 FM on August 20, 2007. Rebroadcaster CKSM was not affected by this decision.

In March 2009, then-owner Corus Entertainment announced plans to drop the talk format on Corus Québec outlets CHLN, CJRC-FM in Gatineau, CHLT-FM in Sherbrooke and CKRS-FM in Saguenay in favour of a classic hits-oldies format branded as "Souvenirs Garantis", effective on March 28, 2009.

On December 17, 2010, the CRTC approved the sale of most of Corus' radio stations in Quebec, including CHLN-FM, to Cogeco.

On February 21 at 5:30 am, CHLN-FM flipped to the Hot Adult Contemporary format and CKOI branding implemented by its Montreal sister station, CKOI-FM, as the station change its callsign to CKOB-FM.

On June 20, 2012, Cogeco announced that CKOB-FM, along with CKOF-FM and CKOY-FM, will revert to their talk formats on August 20, 2012, all but dismantling the CKOI network. Apart from an expansion of talk programming, no changes in current talk and sports programming are expected for these stations.

CKOB was a former call sign from an AM radio station, CKOB in Renfrew, Ontario in the 1970s through to the 1990s and the call sign was believed to be used previously as a radio station repeater in Obed Mine, Alberta.

References

External links 
106,9 FM
 

Kob
Kob
Kob
Kob
Radio stations established in 1937
1937 establishments in Quebec